Shivsena Nepal (translation: Shiva's Army of Nepal) is a political party in Nepal. The party was founded in 1990 by Arun Subedi, in response to the demands for secularism in the backdrop of the Jana Andolan.

In difference to the Nepal Shivsena, Shivsena Nepal has profiled itself mainly as a religious organisation. Whereas Nepal Shivsena has links to the Indian Shiv Sena, Shivsena Nepal denies such links.

The party was registered with the Election Commission of Nepal ahead of the 2008 Constituent Assembly election.

When the Taliban began destroying the Buddhistic ancient artifacts, the Nepal Shiv Sena and the Shivsena Nepal strongly criticized the attacks.

Organisation
The party claims to have organisation in 36 out of 77 districts of Nepal. Its main base, according to Subedi, is in the Terai areas.

References

Nepalese Hindu political parties
1990 establishments in Nepal